Reason is an American libertarian monthly magazine published by the Reason Foundation. The magazine has a circulation of around 50,000 and was named one of the 50 best magazines in 2003 and 2004 by the Chicago Tribune.

History 
Reason was founded in 1968 by Lanny Friedlander (1947–2011), a student at Boston University, as a more-or-less monthly mimeographed publication. In 1970 it was purchased by Robert W. Poole Jr., Manuel S. Klausner, and Tibor R. Machan, who set it on a more regular publishing schedule. As the monthly print magazine of "free minds and free markets", it covers politics, culture, and ideas with a mix of news, analysis, commentary, and reviews.

During the 1970s and 80s, the magazine's contributors included Milton Friedman, Murray Rothbard, Thomas Szasz, and Thomas Sowell. In 1978, Poole, Klausner, and Machan created the associated Reason Foundation, in order to expand the magazine's ideas into policy research. Marty Zupan joined Reason in 1975, and served through the 1980s as managing editor and editor-in-chief, leaving in 1989.

Virginia Postrel was editor-in-chief of the magazine from July 1989 to January 2000. She founded the magazine's website in 1995. Nick Gillespie became editor-in-chief in 2000. Erik Spiekermann, the designer of the Meta typeface, headed a redesign of Reason in 2001, aiming for a look that is "cleaner, more modern, making use of the Meta typeface throughout".

In June 2004, subscribers to Reason magazine received a personalized issue that had their name, and a satellite photo of their home or workplace on the cover. The concept was to demonstrate the power of public databases, as well as the customized printing capabilities of Xeikon's printer, according to then editor-in-chief Nick Gillespie. The move was seen by David Carr of The New York Times as "the ultimate in customized publishing", as well as "a remarkable demonstration of the growing number of ways databases can be harnessed."

In 2008, Reasons website was named a Webby Award Honoree in the magazine category. That same year, Matt Welch became magazine's editor-in-chief, with Gillespie becoming editor-in-chief of reason.tv. In 2011, Gillespie and Welch published The Declaration of Independents: How Libertarian Politics Can Fix What's Wrong with America.

Katherine Mangu-Ward became the magazine's editor-in-chief in June 2016, with Welch moving to an editor-at-large position.  Other Reason editors include Jacob Sullum, Jesse Walker and Brian Doherty; contributors include Ronald Bailey, Cathy Young, and cartoonist Peter Bagge.

In 2017, Reason magazine began hosting The Volokh Conspiracy, a blog written by libertarian and conservative law professors and run by Eugene Volokh.

Hit & Run
Hit & Run was Reason'''s group blog. It was maintained and written by the staff of the magazine. It was started in 2002 and discontinued on April 14, 2019 with reason.com's site redesign. Then-editor Gillespie and then-Web editor Tim Cavanaugh, both veterans of Suck.com, modeled the blog in some ways after that website: they brought along several other Suck.com writers to contribute, fostered a style in the blog matching that former website's sarcastic attitude, and even the name "Hit & Run" was taken from what had been a weekly news roundup column on Suck.com. Reason editors referred to this co-opting of the former website as the "Suck-ification of Reason".

In 2005, Hit & Run was named as one of the best political blogs by Playboy.

Reason TV
Reason TV is a website affiliated with Reason magazine that produces short-form documentaries and video editorials. Nick Gillespie is editor-in-chief. The site produced a series of videos called The Drew Carey Project hosted by comedian Drew Carey. Reason.tv teamed with Carey again in 2009 to produce "Reason Saves Cleveland," in which Carey suggested free market solutions to his hometown's problems.

Since 2010, comedian Remy Munasifi has partnered with Reason TV to produce parody videos. Since 2017, John Stossel has produced more than 100 commentary segments published on the ReasonTV YouTube channel.

See also

 The Declaration of Independents'' (book)

References

External links
 
 
 
 Reason Feb. 1976: Special Revisionism Issue

American political websites
Classical liberalism
Libertarian magazines published in the United States
Libertarian publications
Libertarianism in the United States
Magazines established in 1968
Magazines published in California
Monthly magazines published in the United States